The Canton of Le Vauclin is a former canton in the arrondissement of Le Marin, Martinique. It had 9,140 inhabitants (2012). It was disbanded in 2015. The canton comprised the commune of Le Vauclin.

References

Cantons of Martinique